The women's 50 metre butterfly event at the 2015 African Games took place on 7 September 2015 at Kintele Aquatic Complex.

Schedule
All times are Congo Standard Time (UTC+01:00)

Records 

Prior to the competition, the existing world and championship records were as follows.

The following new records were set during this competition.

Results

Heats

Final

References

External links
Official website

Swimming at the 2015 African Games
2015 in women's swimming